Musikot may refer to 
 Musikot, Western Rukum, a municipality in Western Rukum District, Karnali, Nepal
 Musikot Airport, another name for Rukum Salle Airport
 Musikot, Gulmi, a municipality in Gulmi